Rafael Alexandrino dos Santos (born 8 October 1983), commonly known as Rafael Baiano, is a Brazilian footballer. A forward, he currently plays for São Bento.

References

External links

Rafael Baiano BDFA

1983 births
Living people
Brazilian footballers
Brazilian expatriate footballers
Club Olimpia footballers
Expatriate footballers in Paraguay
Expatriate footballers in Switzerland
Association football forwards